Alışanlı (also, Alyshanly and Alishanly) is a village and municipality in the Masally Rayon of Azerbaijan.  It has a population of 875.

References 

Populated places in Masally District